Societas Domi Pacificae, colloquially known as The Pacifica House or SDP, is a secret society based at Brown University, in Providence, Rhode Island, and is the oldest student secret society in the United States. Organized in 1824 as The Franklin Society, it was created in a year when such a large class entered Brown University that the two existing literary debating societies, the Philermenian Society and the United Brothers Society could not accommodate the new students.  Notable personages such as Thomas Jefferson, John Quincy Adams, and Henry Clay accepted honorary membership into the society during this time. The society was founded with the motto: Scientia Potentia Est, meaning “Knowledge is Power.”

Martha Mitchell's research in the Encyclopedia Brunoniana indicated that the society was dissolved some time in the 1840s. However, there is at least one reference that seems to indicate it is possible the society existed at least until the late 19th century: "It is believed to have been the first society organization in this city to institute a course of popular lectures for the public entertainment and instruction.  Through its lectures it has introduced to the citizens some of the most noted scientists of the world."

In recent years it has become evident that instead of being fully dissolved, the society instead changed its name to Societas Domi Pacifica and became even more secretive. It exists today under this name, and continues to tap an unknown, though assumed to be 15, number of seniors to join the society each year. The motto that they adopted after their change is "Videte igitur ut probe integreque in emolumentum Dei et Republicae et Universitatis." This translates into, "see, and consequently, you will conduct yourself properly and irreproachably into the benefits of God, the Republic, and the University."

History

Records indicate that ten years after its establishment, in 1834, a select core of students in the Franklin Society recognized that the quality of members had diminished due to competition with the other two literary societies and the new emergence and popularity of Fraternities. Recognizing a loss of general integrity within the Society, the Franklin Society was dissolved, its library of several hundred volumes was turned over to the College Library, and in 1847 its members were elected in equal proportions into the two older societies. Save a few references in the 19th century, the Franklin Society's presence and impact on the campus is unknown and undocumented.

Continued evidence of activity
The small bit that is known seems to indicate that the Franklin Society was originally "devoted especially to the study of natural science and the mechanic arts,"   Further, that in 1887, the Franklin Society commissioned a "Report of the Committee on the geology of Rhode Island." These references seem to indicate a continued presence of the society beyond 1834, when it was believed to have been dissolved.

Modern activity
Further evidence of the continued existence of the Franklin Society has emerged on Brown's campus with the activities of Societas Domi Pacificae, known as Pacifica House or SDP for short.  Pacifica House claims to have been founded in 1824, and that it is directly related to the Franklin Society.  While little is known of their operations today, they maintain a website containing their seal and their motto: "Videte igitur ut probe integreque in emolumentum Dei et Republicae et Universitatis."  This translates to, "see, and consequently, you will conduct yourself properly and irreproachably into the benefits of God, the Republic, and the University."

Membership

Membership in the society is completely secretive. No one knows either the number of students selected or the names of these students. However, it is believed that the society taps 15 seniors to join the society each year.

Coat of arms

The Franklin Society coat of arms consisted of three golden key intersecting each other, with the Brown crest in the background.  The Brown crest serves as a tribute to the University, while the three keys are distinctly Franklin symbols.  The three keys, partially references to Benjamin Franklin's electricity experiment involving a key and a kite, are said to represent Science, Reason and Action.

It is not possible that this is the same seal that was used when the society was founded, as the Brown University seal was that of the College of Rhode Island until 1844. However, it is possible that this seal was used from that point onward.

The society changed their coat of arms, but the meaning behind the new symbols remains a mystery.

References

Brown University organizations
Collegiate secret societies
Student societies in the United States
Student organizations established in 1824
Secret societies in the United States
1824 establishments in Rhode Island